The 290s decade ran from January 1, 290, to December 31, 299.

Significant people

References